Mikhail Vasilyevich Yakovlev (12 July 1893–1942) was an association football player. Yakovlev made his debut for Russia on July 1, 1912 in a 1912 Olympics game against Germany. He was killed as a civilian in the Siege of Leningrad during World War II.

References

External links
 Profile 

1892 births
1942 deaths
Russian footballers
Footballers from the Russian Empire
Russia international footballers
Footballers at the 1912 Summer Olympics
Olympic footballers of Russia
Association football midfielders
Association football defenders
Victims of the Siege of Leningrad